Fugitive Prince is volume four of the Wars of Light and Shadow by Janny Wurts. It is also volume one of the Alliance of Light, the third story arc in the Wars of Light and Shadow.

External links
Fugitive Prince Webpage
Fugitive Prince Excerpt

1995 American novels
American fantasy novels
Wars of Light and Shadow
Alliance of Light
HarperCollins books